This is a list of Sheriffs of Caernarvonshire (or Carnarvonshire).

The Sheriff is the oldest secular office under the Crown. Formerly the Sheriff was the principal law enforcement officer in a county but over the centuries most of the responsibilities associated with the post have been transferred elsewhere or are now defunct, so that its functions are now largely ceremonial. The Sheriff changes every March.

On 1 April 1974, under the provisions of the Local Government Act 1972, the counties of  Caernarvonshire, together with that of Anglesey and Merionethshire were abolished along with their shrievalties, and were replaced by the new county of Gwynedd and the new office of High Sheriff of Gwynedd.

List of Sheriffs

1284–1295: Richard de Pulsedon, brother of Sir Roger de Pulesdon, Sheriff of Anglesey 
1295–1299: Robert de London
1299–1307: Henry de Dynynton
1308–1309 or 1310: Gruffudd ap Rhys
1309 or 1310–1315: William Troutwyn
1315–1316: Richard Casteleyn
1316–1321: John de Sapy
1321–1325: Giles de Bello Campo (Giles de Beauchamp)
1325–1326: Madog Gloddaith
1326–1327: Richard Ate
1327–1329: Giles de Bello Campo
1329–1332: Richard Ate
1332–1337: Hywel ap Henri
1337: Stephen de Pulton
1339–1345: Richard FitzAlan, 10th Earl of Arundel
1345–1346: Edward de St John
1347–1348: Einion ap Philip
1348–1350: Robert de Holewell
1350–1351: Robert de Parys
1351–1359: Einion ap Gruffudd
1359–1360: Thomas de Middelton
unknown date: Ade Haye
unknown date: Robert Stircheley
1376–1378: Hugh Coly
1378–1382: William de Hunton
1382–1385: Thomas de Wodelef
1385–1390: Ifan ab Einion ap Gruffudd
1390–1395: Hugh Coly
1395–1399: Richard de Pykemere
1399–1407?: Siôn ap Hywel
1407: Reginald Bayldon
1407–1408: John Salshall
1408–1409: Robert Fenrether
1410–1411: Thomas Camvill
1411–1413: Hugh Huls
1413–1437: Nicholas Saxton
1437–1460: John Hynde
1461–1473: Sir Henry Bolde
1473–1483: Anthony Woodville, 2nd Earl Rivers
1484–1485: Thomas Tunstall
1485–1500: Wiliam ap Gruffudd ap Robyn of Cochwillan
1500–1527: Sir Hugh Vaughan jointly with
1505–1506: Ralph Birkenhead
1527–1540?: Sir Richard Bulkeley
1540?–1541: Edmund Lloyd, of Glynllifon
1541: Griffith ap Robert Vaughan
1541 William Wynn Williams of Cochwillan
1542 Sir Richard Bulkeley, of Beaumaris, Kt 
1543 John Puleston of Caernarvon 
1544 John "Wynn" ap Maredudd, of Gwydir Castle
1545 Hugh Peak, of Conway

Edward VI
1546 William Williams, of Cochwillan 
1547 Griffith ap William Madog, of Llwyndyrus 
1548 John ap Robert ap Llywelyn Ithel, of Caftellmarch 
1549 Sir Richard Bulkeley, of Beaumaris, Kt
1550 John Wynn ap Hugh of Bodyel in Llannor 
1551 Hugh Peake, of Conway 
1552 William Williams, of Cochwillan

Mary I
1553 Griffith ap William Madog, of Llwyndyrus 
1554 Maurice Wynn, of Gwydir Castle
1555 Griffith Davies of Caernarvon 
1556 John "Wynn" ap Maredudd, of Gwydir Castle
1557 Sir Richard Bulkeley of Beaumaris, Kt.

Elizabeth I
1558 Ellis Price, Plas Iolyn, doctor of law 
1559 John Wynn ap Hugh of Bodvel in Llannor
1560 Robert Pugh of Creuddin 
1561 William Glynn, of Glynn Llivon 
1562 William Griffith, of Caernarvon 
1563 Griffith Glynne, of Pwllheli 
1564 Griffith Davies of Caernarvon 
1565 William Herbert, of Swansea, Kt 
1566 Sir Rice Griffith of Penrhyn, Kt 
1567 William Mostyn of Mostyn Hall
1568 Thomas Owens, of Plas Du (the celebrated Epigrammatist's ancestor) 
1569 Maurice Wynn, of Gwydir Castle
1570 Edward Williams; alias Edward Wynne ap Williams, of Maes y Castell
1571 Richard Mostyn, of Bodyscallen
1572 Griffith Davies of Caernarvon
1573 Rice Thomas, of Caernarvon
1574 Rowland Pulefton, of Caernarvon
1575 Richard Peake, of Conway
1576 Edward Conway, of Bryn Eiryn
1577 Maurice Wynn, of Gwydir Castle
1578 Richard Vaughan, of Llwyndyrys, Caernarvonshire
1579 Maurice Kyffin, of Maenan
1580 William Thomas, of Caernarvon
1581 William Maurice of Clenennau
1582 John Griffith, of Caernarvon
1583 Thomas Mostyn of Mostyn Hall
1584 John Wynne ap Hugh ap Richard, of Bodwrda
1585 John Vaughan, of Penmachno (the Queen's footman)
1586 Thomas Madryn, of Madryn
1587 John Wynn of Gwydir Castle
1588 Hugh Gwyn Bodvel of Bodvel, Llannor
1589 Griffith ap John Griffith, of Llŷn
1590 Robert Wynne of Conway
1591 William Williams, of Cochwillan
1592 Richard Puleston, of Caernarvon
1593 Richard Gwynne, of Caernarvon
1594 Robert Wynne, of Bryncir
1595 William Maurice of Clenennau
1596 Hugh Gwynne, of Bodvel
1597 Thomas Vaughan, of Pant Glas
1598 William Williams, of Vaynol
1599 Hugh Gwynne, of Penarth
1600 Richard Vaughan, of Plas Hen
1601 Maurice Lewis, of Ffestiniog
1602

James I
1603 John Wynne, of Gwydir
1604 John Griffith, of Llŷn
1605 Robert Madryn, of Madryn
1606 Hugh Bodurda, of Bodurda
1607 William Williams, of Vaenol
1608 William Thomas, of Caernarvon
1609 Thomas Bodvel, of Bodvel
1610 Robert Prichard, of Conway
1611 William Glynn, of Penllechog
1612 William Humphreys, of Pant Du
1613 William Vaughan, of Plas Hen
1614 Humphrey Meredith, of Clynog
1615 Griffith Hughes, of Cefn Llanfair
1616 William Griffith, of Caernarvon
1617 Simon William, of Weeg
1618 John Griffith, junior, of Llŷn
1619 John Wynne, of Penllech
1620 Robert Wynne, of Glascoed
1621 Robert Owen, of Ystum Cegid
1622 Thomas Glynn of Glynllifon
1623 John Bodvel, of Bodvel
1624 Ellis Brynkir, of Bryncir
1625 Richard Evans, of Elernion

Charles I
1625 Richard Evans, of Elernion
1626 Thomas Williams, of Vaenol
1627 Thomas Glyn, of Nantlli
1628 John Vaughan, of Pantglas
1629 Henry Humphreys, of Pwllheli
1630 John Bodurda, of Bodurda
1631 John Owen, of Clenennau
1632 William Vaughan, of Cors y Gedol
1633 Griffith Madryn, of Madryn
1634 William Glyn of Elernion
1635 John Wynne, of Conway
1636 Evan Wynne, of Saethon
1637 William Lewis Anwyl of Parc
1638 William Thomas, of Aber
1639 William Williams, of Vaenol, baronet
1640 William Hookes, of Conway
1641 James Brynkir, of Bryncir
1642 Thomas Cheadle, of Beaumaris
1643 Thomas Madryn, of Madryn
1644 Robert Jones, of Castellmarch
1645 Sir John Owen, of Clenenney
1646 Sir John Owen
1647 Thomas Williams, of Dinas
1648 William Lloyd, of Plas Hen

The Commonwealth

1649 Thomas Madryn, of Madryn
1649 John Carter, of Cyn Mael 
1650 Sir Griffith Williams 
1651: Henry Williams of Maes-y-Castell 
1653: Sir Owen Wynn, 3rd Baronet, of Gwydir Castle, Llanrwst|
1654: Sir William Williams, 3rd Baronet 
1655: Edward Williams of Wig 
1656: William Vaughan of Plashern 
1657: Richard Anwyl, of Hafodwrid 
1658: Richard Wynn, of Gwydir Castle, Llanrwst
1659: John Williams, of Meillionydd

Charles II
1660: John Williams, of Meillionydd 
1661: William Griffith of Cefnamlwch, Lleyn 
1662: Sir Griffith Williams, 1st Baronet of Penrhyn 
1663: Richard Cyffin, of Maenan 
1664: Gruffudd Jones of Castellmarch 
1665: Richard Glyn of Elernion 
12 November 1665: Colonel Thomas Madryn, of Madryn, Llŷn
7 November 1666: Sir Roger Mostyn, 1st Baronet, of Mostyn Hall
6 November 1667: William Lloyd, of Bodfan
6 November 1668: John Glynn, of Glynllifon
11 November 1669: Sir Robert Williams, 2nd Baronet, of Penrhyn
1671: Ieuan "Llwyd" ap Humphrey "Wyn" of Hafodlwyfog
1672: William Wynn of Glanrafon 
1673: William Wynn, of Llanwrda 
1674: William Griffith, of Madryn isaf 
1675: Sir John Wynn, 5th Baronet of Wattstay
1676: Owen Wynne, of Ystymcedig 
1676: Peter Pennant of Bychton 
1676: Holland Williams
1677: Richard Wynn, of Glasinfryn  
1678: Griffith Vaughan, of Plashen  
1679: Thomas Wynn, of Glascoed
1680: William Lloyd, of Hafodlwyfog 
1681: Edward Williams, Meillionydd 
1682: William Arthur, Bangor 
1683: George Twisleton, of Llenar 
1684: Robert Coytmor, of Tymawr

James II
1685: Love Parry, of Cefn Llanfair 
1686: William Wynne 
1687: Hugh Bodwrda 
1688: Hon. Thomas Bulkeley of Dinas

William III
1689: Sir Thomas Mostyn 
1690: Samuel Hanson of Bodvel 
1691: Hugh Lewis of Pont Newydd 
1692: John Rowland of Nant 
1693: John Thomas of Aber 
1694: Richard Madryn of Llanerch 
1695: James Brynkir of Brynkir  
1696: Richard Edwards of Nanhoran in Lleyn 
1697: David Parry of Llwynynn 
1698: Henry Vaughan of Pantglas 
1699: Richard Vaughan of Plashen 
1700: Pierce LLoyd of Lllanidan  
1701: Edward Holland of Conwy 
1701: Sir Roger Mostyn, 3rd Baronet of Mostyn Hall

Anne
1702: Arthur Williams of Mellionydd  
1703: Simon Fowkes of Bodvel  
1704: Lloyd Bodvel of Bodvan (jointly with Griffith Wynn) 
1705: Thomas Roberts of Brynneuadd  
1706: Richard Owen of Peniarth  
1707: Sir William Williams, 2nd Baronet of Llanforda, Oswestry  
1708: Sir Griffith Williams, 6th Baronet of Marie  
1709: George Coytmore, of Coytmor 
1710: John Griffith, of Aber 
1711: Roger Price 
1712: Thomas Wynn, of Glynllifon and Bodfean Hall
1713: Huw Davies of Caerhun

George I
1714: Thomas Ellis, of Wern 
1715: Timothy Edwards, Cefnmain 
1716: Lewis Owen, of Peniarth 
1717: John Wynn, of Melai 
1718: William Wynne 
1719: William Bodvell of Madryn 
1720: Edward Baily, of Gorswen 
1721: Hugh Lewis, Pontnewydd 
1722: Love Parry, of Wernfawr 
1723: Thomas Rowland, of Nant 
1724: William Wynne, of Llanwrda 
1725: William Brynkir, of Treborth 
1726: Humphrey Roberts, Brynneuadd

George II
1727: Hugh Winne, of Waine  
1728: William Wynn, of Llanfair 
1729: Izacheus Hughes of Trevan 
1730: Maurice Wynn, of Penybryn 
1731: William Butler of Llysfan 
1732: William Price of Penmorva
1733: John Wynn of Glynllifon 
1734: John Griffith, of Caernarvon 
1735: William Wynne 
1736: Humphrey Owen, of Bodidda 
1737: George Devereux of Sahone (Saython) 
1738: Humphry Meredith, of Pengwern 
1739: John Lloyd of Tyddynbychan 
1740: Rice Williams, of Glanyrafan 
1741: John Owen 
1742: Hugh Williams of Pentir 
1743: Edward Philip Pugh 
1744: William Brynker the younger of Brynker 
1745: John Hoare of Conway 
1746: William Thomas of Coedallen 
1747: Robert Parry of Mellionen 
1748: Christopher Butler of Llysffaen 
1749: Charles Allanson of Vaenol 
1750: Owen Holland of Conway  
1751: Charles Evans of Treveilir, Anglesea 
1752: John Lloyd of Porthyraur 
1753: Owen Hughes of Trefan 
1754: Hugh Davis of Carlum 
1755: Richard Lloyd of Tal-y-bryn 
1756: William Owen of Clenenney 
1757: Robert Wynne of Llanerch  
1758: Zacheus Jones of Aber y Pwll 
1759: William Smith of Vaenol

George III
1760: Richard Lloyd of Tynewydd 
1761: Robert Wynn of Farchwoll 
1762: Hugh Hughes of Bodvan 
1763: Love Parry of Waenfawr 
1764: John Griffith of Garreglwyd, Anglesey 
1765: John Griffith of Cefnamwlch 
1766: Hugh Williams of Pentir 
1767: Edward Lloyd of Pengwern 
1768: Robert Howel Vaughan of Meillionydd 
1769: Robert Godolphin Owen, of Clenenney 
1770: William Archer of Llechan 
1771: Rice Thomas of Coedhelen 
1772: Richard Parry of Meillionen 
1773: Ralph Griffith of Caerhun  
1774: Thomas Assheton Smith of Vaynol
1775: Hugh Stoddart of Diganwy 
1776: James Coytmor Pugh of Penrhyn 
1777: Hugh Griffith of Brynodol 
1778: John Rowlands of Bodaden 
1779: Jeffery Prendergast of Marie 
1780: Robert Lloyd of Gwnys and Tregaian 
1781: Edward Carreg 
1782: Richard Pennant 
1783: Thomas Ashton Smith of Vaynol  
1784: Robert Wynne  
1785: John Jones, of Brynhir 
1786: John Griffith of Tryfan  
1787: John Lloyd  
1788: Henry Pritchard  
1789: William Hughes, of Nantcall 
1790: Robert Lloyd of Cesailgyfarch  
1791: Richard Lloyd 
1792: Edward Lloyd  
1793: William Owen, of Pencraig (replacing Richard Lloyd)
1794: Richard Lloyd of Bronhaulog  
1795: William Jones of Bodfordd   
1796: William John Lenthal of Bessels Leigh Manor, Berks 
1797: Sir Edward Pryce Lloyd, 2nd Baronet of Pengwern Place 
1798: Sir Thomas Mostyn, 6th Baronet of Gloddaeth Hall
1799: Evan Lloyd of Portyraur   
5 February 1800: Evan Prichard, of Tynewydd
21 February 1800: Rice Edwards, of Porthyregwl
14 March 1800: Rowland Jones, of Weirglodd Fawr
11 February 1801: William Hervey, of Bodvel
3 February 1802: Robert William Wynne, of Llanerch
3 February 1803: Gwyllym Lloyd Wardle, of Wernfawr
1 February 1804: Owen Molyneux Wynne, of Penmachno
6 February 1805: Richard Garnons, of Pantdu
1 February 1806: William Williams, of Llangystennin
4 February 1807: Hugh Rowlands, of Bodaden
3 February 1808: Robert Thomas Carreg, of Carreg
6 February 1809: Thomas Parry Jones Parry, of Madryn
15 March 1809: William Griffith, of Bodegroes
31 January 1810: Humphrey Rowland Jones, of Ystumllyn
8 February 1811: Thomas Parry Jones-Parry, of Madryn
24 January 1812: Hon. Peter Robert Drummond-Burrell, of Gwydir
4 March 1812: George Thomas Smith, of Penydyffryn
10 February 1813: John Griffith, of Llanfair
4 February 1814: Charles Wynne Griffith Wynne, of Cefn Amwlch
13 February 1815: William Gryffydd Oakeley, of Bachysaint
1816: Thomas Burrowes of Benarth 
1817: John Lloyd of Trallwyn 
1818: Thomas Jones of Bryntirion 
1819: George Hay Dawkins-Pennant of Penrhyn Castle

George IV
1820: William Ormsby-Gore of Clenenney  
1821: Joseph Huddart, of Brynker 
1822: William Lloyd Caldecot, of the Cottage 
1823: William Turner, of Parkia, Criccieth
1824: Sir David Erskine, 1st Baronet of Plas Isa  
1825: Henry Davies Griffith of Caerhun
1826: Kyffin John William Lenthall of Maenan 
1827: William Glyn Griffith of Bodegroes  
1828: R. Watkin Price of Bron-y-gader
1829: Thomas Lloyd, of Glangwna, died and replaced by Daniel Vaudrey, of Plasgwynant

William IV
1830: John Williams, of Bryntirion
1831: Rice Thomas, of Codehelen
1832: John Rowlands, of Plas-tirion
1833: David Price Downes, of Hendre-rhys-gethin
1834: Richard Lloyd Edwards, of Nanhoron
1835: John Morgan, of Weeg
1836: Thomas Parry Jones Parry, of Aber-du-nant
1837: Hon. Thomas Pryce Lloyd, of Plashen

Victoria
1838: Sir Richard Bulkeley Williams-Bulkeley, 10th Baronet, of Plas-y-nant
1839: John Williams, of Hendregadno
1840: Hon. Edward Mostyn Lloyd Mostyn, of Plas Hên
1841: David White Griffith, of Hafodydd-Brithion
1842: John Griffith Watkins, of Plas Llanfair
1843: David Jones, of Bodfan
1844–1845: John Price, of Garth y Glo
1846: Charles Henry Evans, of Pontnewydd
1847: Thomas Wright, of Derwenfawr
1848: George Augustus Huddart, of Brynkir
1849: Samuel Owen Priestley, of Trefan
1850: Isaac Walker, of Hendre-gadredd
1851: John Williams, of Hafodyllan
1852: Martin Williams, of Penamser, was initially appointed, but was replaced by George Hammond Whalley, of Plas Madoc, Ruabon
1853: Robert Vaughan Wynne Williams, of Llandudno
1854: Sir Thomas Duncombe Love Jones-Parry, 1st Baronet, of Madryn, Nefyn
1855: Samuel Dukinfield Darbishire, of Pendyffryn
1856: John MacDonald, of Plas-ucha-Dwygyfylchwy
1857: James Edwards, of Benarth
1858: John Nanney, of Maesyneuadd
1859: John Lloyd Jones, of Broom Hall
1860: John Whitehead Greaves, of Tanyrallt
1861: Henry McKellar, of Sygunfawr
1862: David Williams, of Castle Deudraeth
1863: John Platt, of Bryn-y-neuadd
1864: Griffith Humphreys Owen, of Ymwlch
1865: Charles Millar, of Penrhos
1866: John Dicken Whitehead, of Glangwna 
1867: Abram Jones Williams, of Gelliwig 
1868: Robert Sorton Parry, of Tan-y-Graig 
1869: Rice William Thomas, of Coed Helen 
1870: Hugh John Ellis-Nanney, of Plas-ben, Esq.
1871: John Griffith Wynn Griffith, of Llanfair
1872: Owen Evans, of Broom Hall 
1873: Thomas Turner, of Plasbrereton 
1874: Benjamin Thomas Ellis, of Rhyllech 
1875: Edward Griffith Powell, of Coedmawr 
1876: Robert Carreg, of Carreg 
1877: Henry Platt, of Gorddinog 
1878: George William Duff Assheton Smith, of Vaynol
1879: Henry Kneeshaw, of Tanyfoel, Penmaenmawr 
1880: Francis William Lloyd Edwards, Nanhoron 
1881: Charles Arthur Wynne Finch, Y Foelas, Pentrefoelas 
1882: Joseph Evans, Glyn 
1883: John Owen, Tŷ Coch 
1884: Albert Wood, Bodlondeb 
1885: John Ernest Greaves, of Plas Hen
1886: Sir Llewellyn Turner, of Parkia, Criccieth
1887: Francis William Alexander Roche of Portmadoc 
1888: Sydney Platt of Bryn-y-neuadd, Llanfairfechan 
1889: Edward Brooke JP, of Conwy
1890: William Bostock, of Colwyn Bay
1891: Thomas Barker, of Plas Gogarth, Llandudno
1892: Joseph Broome, of Sunny Hill, Llandudno
1893: Charles Frost, of Minydon, Colwyn 
1894: Hon. Frederick George Wynn of Glynllifon Park, Caernarfon
1895: John Albert Alexander Williams of Aberglaslyn Hall, Beddgelert
1896: Richard Methuen Greaves of Wern, Porthmadog
1897: Lloyd Warren George Hughes of Coedhelen, Carnarvon 
1898: George Farren of Trefenai,Carnarvon 
1899: John Robinson of Talysarn
1900: Thomas Lewis of Gartherwen, Bangor

Edward VII
1901: Lieutenant-Colonel Owen Lloyd Jones Evans, of Broomhall, Chwilog
1902: Ephraim Wood, of Pabo Hall, Conwy
1903: Frank Stewart Barnard, of Bryn Bras Castle
1904: Lt.-Colonel Llewellyn England Sydney Parry, of Stainsford House, Dorchester
1905: John Issard Davies, of Llysmeirion, Carnarvon 
1906: Francis John Lloyd Priestley of Ymwlch, Criccieth 
1907: Sir Owen Roberts, of Dinas, Caernarfon
1908: Charles Garden Assheton-Smith, of Vaynol Park, Bangor 
1909: Owen Jones, of Glanbeuno, Carnarvon 
1910: David Pierce Williams, of Vrondinas, near Carnarvon

George V
1911: Thomas Edwards Roberts, of Plas-y-Bryn, near Carnarvon 
1912: John Evan Roberts, of Brynmar, Bangor
1913: Thomas Roberts of Maesygroes, near Bangor 
1914: Thomas Rowland Hughes 
1915: Joseph Wallis Goddard 
1916: Ernest Albert Neele, of Plas Dinorwic, Port Dinorwic 
1917: Sir Frederick Henry Smith, 1st Baronet of Queen's Lodge, Colwyn Bay 
1918: David Thomas Lake, of Highfield, Carnarvon 
1919: Lewis Rivett of Marine Crescent, Deganwy  
1920: Thomas Frederick Tattersall
1921: Major John Robert Williams of Ardre, Penmaenmawr 
1922: William Malesbury Letts, CBE
1923: Charles William Keighley 
1924: Robert Gwyneddon Davies of " Gradanfryn," Llanwnda 
1925: Albert Henry Mallalieu, JP
1926: John Robert Collie, of "Bryn Rhedyn", Conway 
1927: Griffith Hughes Roberts, of Glanrhyd, Edeyrn 
1928: Henry Pratt, of Bron Derw, Penrhyn Bay, near Llandudno 
1929: Sir Robert Armstrong-Jones, CBE
1930: Watkin Williams
1931: Duncan Elliott Alves, of Bryn Bras Castle, Caernarvon 
1932: Sir Michael Robert Vivian Duff-Assheton-Smith, Bt, of Vaynol Park, Bangor 
1933: Richard Elias Pritchard
1934: Frank Charles Minoprio
1935: Owen Cadwaladr Roberts, of York House, Stanmore, Middlesex and Ael y Bryn, Llanrhos Road, Deganwy 
1936: Ronald Owen Lloyd Armstrong-Jones

George VI
1937: Herbert Wood, of The Cottage, Sylva Gardens South, Llandudno and Green Royd, Brighouse 
1938: Thomas William Pierce, of Quellyn, Caernarvon 
1939: John Thomas, of Cefn, Llanengan, Abersoch and Mollington Road, Wallasey, Cheshire
1940: Eldred Owen Roberts, of Plasybryn, Bontnewydd, Caernarvon, and Old Forge Close, Stanmore, Middlesex 
1941: David Lewis Jones
1942: Griffith Ivor Evans of Bryn Teg, Caernarvon 
1943: Samuel Victor Beer 
1944: William Penry Williams of Ty Coch, Caernarvon 
1945: Lieut.-Colonel William Hilton Parry,M.C. of Ty Newydd, Caernarvon 
1946: George Brymer, MC of Meifod, Bontnewydd, Caernarvon 
1947: Emyr Wyn Jones of Llety'r Eos Llanfairtalhaearn and of Seibiant, Pontllyfni 
1948: David Allen Bryan of The Gables, Penmaenmawr 
1949: Owen Percy Griffith of Berwyn, Caernarvon 
1950: Lady Margaret Gladwyn Goronwy Owen, of Llwynybrain, Llanrug 
1951: Henry Humphries Jones of Cefn-y-Coed, Roewen, Conway, and of Menlove Avenue, Liverpool 
1952: Rev. William Pierce Owen of Ffridd, Nantlle

Elizabeth II
1953: Joseph Thomas Jones of Bryn Arfon, Woodlands, Conway.
1954: Alfred Reginald Chadwick Huntington, M.B.E. of Carreg Bran, Llanfairpwll.
1955: Dr Robert Alun-Roberts, of Hafod-y-Coed, Victoria Drive, Bangor.
1956: Hugh Morris Roberts of Barclays Bank House, Aberystwyth and Bronygaer, South Road, Caernarvon
1957: Pyrs William Morris of Glanbeuno, Bontnewydd
1958: Dr Robert Hughes Parry of Cefniwrch, Criccieth
1959: Alderman William Hugheston-Roberts of Ty Gwyn, Tremadoc
1960: Dr Gwilym ap Vychan Jones of Y Betws, Portdinorwic
1961: Dr Robert Rees Prytherch of Plas Newydd, Criccieth
1962: George Trevor Brymer of Meifod, Bontnewydd
1963: Edward Samuel Evans of Plas Hendre, Cwm Pennant, Garn, Dolbenmaen
1964: William Trefor Matthews of Bryn Teg, Caernarvon
1965: Roger Clough-Williams-Ellis of Glasfryn, near Pwllheli
1966: Christopher Baskin Briggs, B.E.M., of Pen-y-Gwryd, Nantgwynant
1967: Professor David Richard Seaborne Davies of Y Garn, Pwllheli.
1968: Sir Reginald Lawrence William Williams, 7th Baronet, M.B.E., E.D., of Penrhos, Caeathraw
1969: Evan Wynne Jones of Madryn, Llanfairfechan
1970: John Francis Humphreys Jones of Llwyn y Brain, Llanrug
1971: Major James Richard Edwards Harden, of Nanhoran, Pwllheli
1972: Edward Jones of Y Garn, Conway Old Road, Penmaenmawr
1973: Alwyn Hughes-Jones of Bodarfryn, Groeslon
1974 onwards: see High Sheriff of Gwynedd

Notes

References
 
 

  — various editions
 

 
Caernarfonshire
Caernarvonshire